This is a list of rural localities in Chukotka Autonomous Okrug. Chukotka Autonomous Okrug (Chukotkaken avtonomnyken okrug) or Chukotka is a federal subject (an autonomous okrug) of Russia. It is geographically located in the Far East region of the country, and is administratively part of the Far Eastern Federal District. Chukotka is the 2nd-least-populated federal subject at 50,526 (2010) and the least densely populated.

Anadyrsky District 
Rural localities in Anadyrsky District:

 Alkatvaam
 Beryozovo
 Chuvanskoye
 Kanchalan
 Khatyrka
 Krasneno
 Lamutskoye
 Markovo
 Meynypilgyno
 Snezhnoye
 Ust-Belaya
 Vayegi

Anadyr Urban Okrug 
Rural localities in Anadyr:

 Tavayvaam

Bilibinsky District 
Rural localities in Bilibinsky District:

 Anyuysk
 Ilirney
 Keperveyem
 Omolon
 Ostrovnoye

Chaunsky District 
Rural localities in Chaunsky District:

 Apapelgino
 Ayon
 Rytkuchi
 Yanranay

Chukotsky District 
Rural localities in Chukotsky District:

 Enurmino
 Inchoun
 Lavrentiya
 Lorino
 Neshkan
 Uelen

Iultinsky District 
Rural localities in Iultinsky District:

 Amguema
 Billings
 Konergino
 Nutepelmen
 Ryrkaypiy
 Uelkal
 Vankarem

Providensky District 
Rural localities in Providensky District:

 Enmelen
 Novoye Chaplino
 Nunligran
 Sireniki
 Yanrakynnot

Shmidtovsky District 
Rural localities in Shmidtovsky District:

 Ushakovskoye

See also 
 
 Lists of rural localities in Russia

References 

Chukotka Autonomous Okrug